Max Kleiber (4 January 1893 – 5 January 1976) was a Swiss agricultural biologist, born and educated in Zurich, Switzerland.

Kleiber graduated from the Federal Institute of Technology as an Agricultural Chemist in 1920, earned the ScD degree in 1924, and became a private dozent after publishing his thesis The Energy Concept in the Science of Nutrition.

Kleiber joined the Animal Husbandry Department of UC Davis in 1929 to construct respiration chambers and conduct research on energy metabolism in animals. Among his many important achievements, two are especially noteworthy. In 1932 he came to the conclusion that the ¾ power of body weight was the most reliable basis for predicting the basal metabolic rate (BMR) of animals and for comparing nutrient requirements among animals of different size. He also provided the basis for the conclusion that total efficiency of energy utilization is independent of body size. These concepts and several others fundamental for understanding energy metabolism are discussed in Kleiber's book, The Fire of Life published in 1961 and subsequently translated into German, Polish, Spanish, and Japanese.

He is credited with the description of the ratio of metabolism to body mass, which became Kleiber's law.

Books
1961: The Fire of Life: An Introduction to Animal Energetics, Max Kleiber

Awards
Guggenheim Fellowship for Natural Sciences, US & Canada

References

External links
Max Kleiber Papers at Special Collections Dept., University Library, University of California, Davis

Swiss biologists
1893 births
1976 deaths
University of California, Davis faculty
20th-century biologists